Aeroflot, the Soviet Union's national carrier, experienced a number of serious accidents and incidents during the 1970s. Including this event, there were nine deadly incidents with more than 100 fatalities, while the total recorded number of casualties was 3,541 for the decade.

Almost all of the events shown below occurred within the Soviet Union. Certain Western media conjectured that the Soviet government was reluctant to publicly admit the occurrence of such events, which might render these figures higher, as fatal events would have only been admitted when there were foreigners aboard the crashed aircraft, the accident took place in a foreign country, or they reached the news for some reason. However, no significant amount of unreported serious accidents have emerged after the dissolution of the USSR, in any of its then-constituent republics.

In the decade, the company lost six aircraft of the type. Aeroflot also retired the Tu-124 (entered the fleet in 1962) following a 1979 accident that killed all 63 on board. The company lost seven aircraft of the type in the decade. Other types lost in accidents/incidents were 170 Antonov An-2s, 18 Antonov An-12s, two Antonov An-22s, 31 Antonov An-24s, three Antonov An-26s, three Avia 14s, one Beriev Be-30, 13 Ilyushin Il-14s, 19 Ilyushin Il-18s, two Ilyushin Il-62s, two Let L-410 Turbolets, six Lisunov Li-2s, 16 Tupolev Tu-104s, seven Tupolev Tu-134s, six Tupolev Tu-154s, and 27 Yakovlev Yak-40s. This totals to 339 aircraft lost in this decade.

List

See also 

Aeroflot accidents and incidents
Aeroflot accidents and incidents in the 1950s
Aeroflot accidents and incidents in the 1960s
Aeroflot accidents and incidents in the 1980s
Aeroflot accidents and incidents in the 1990s
Transport in the Soviet Union

Footnotes

Notes

References

Lists of aviation accidents and incidents
1970s in the Soviet Union